The LWD Żak was a Polish touring and trainer aircraft of the late 1940s, designed in the LWD and built in a short series.

Design and development
The Żak (old-fashioned "student") was designed in the Lotnicze Warsztaty Doświadczalne (LWD, Aviation Experimental Workshops) in Łódź, directed by Tadeusz Sołtyk in 1946, as one of the first Polish post-war aircraft. It was a light low-wing cantilever monoplane of a mixed construction, with a crew of two, sitting side by side, and fixed conventional landing gear. The first prototype Żak-1 was first flown on March 23, 1947. It was powered by the Czechoslovak 65 hp straight engine Walter Mikron III and carried markings SP-AAC. The second prototype Żak-2 was powered by the 65 hp flat engine Continental A-65 and had an open cockpit. It was flown on November 27, 1947, and carried markings SP-AAE.

The design appeared successful and the Ministry of Communication ordered a series of 10 aircraft. They were to be powered by  licence-built A-65 engines, but since plans of engine production were abandoned, it was decided to fit them with Walter Mikron engines. They were also fitted with a closed canopy, sliding rearwards, and named Żak-3. Ten planes were built by the LWD in the end of 1948, the first of them was flown on November 8, 1948. They had markings: SP-AAS to SP-AAZ, and SP-BAA to SP-BAC. At least one (SP-AAX) had engine replaced later with 85 hp (63 kW) Cirrus F.III. They were used in the Polish regional aero clubs until 1955.

On October 20, 1948, there was flown a prototype of the last variant, Żak-4, meant for a glider towing. It had stronger 105 hp Walter engine and an open canopy. Since it showed unsuitable for glider towing, and old Polikarpov Po-2 appeared the better plane for this purpose, Żak-4 was not built in series, and the prototype was re-fitted with a closed canopy and used as a touring plane in aero club (markings SP-BAE).

Variants
Żak-1 (SP-AAC)
The first prototype powered by Walter Mikron III engine.
Żak-2 (SP-AAE)
The second prototype without canopy and powered by Continental A-65 engine.
Żak-3
Main production version with closed canopy and powered by Walter Mikron III engine, 10 built.
Żak-4 (SP-BAE)
Prototype of the glider towing version with open canopy (later refitted with a closed one) and powered by Walter engine.

Operators

Aeroklub Polski

Survivors
Żak-3 SP-AAX is preserved in the Polish Aviation Museum in Kraków (disassembled as for 2007)

Specifications (Żak-3)

See also

References

Babiejczuk, Janusz and Grzegorzewski, Jerzy: Polski przemysł lotniczy 1945-1973 (Polish aviation industry...), Wydawnictwo MON, Warsaw 1974 
 Bridgman, Leonard. Jane's All The World's Aircraft 1953-54. London:Jane's,1953.
Krzyżan, Marian: Samoloty w muzeach polskich, Warsaw 1983,  
Photo and description  at Poser page

External links

Photos at Ugolok Neba page

Zak
1940s Polish civil trainer aircraft
1940s Polish civil utility aircraft
Single-engined tractor aircraft
Low-wing aircraft